Basic copper carbonate is a chemical compound, more properly called copper(II) carbonate hydroxide. It is an ionic compound (a salt) consisting of the ions copper(II) , carbonate , and hydroxide .

The name most commonly refers to the compound with formula2. It is a green crystalline solid that occurs in nature as the mineral malachite. It has been used since antiquity as a pigment, and it is still used as such in artist paints, sometimes called verditer, green bice, or mountain green.

Sometimes the name is used for 2()2, a blue crystalline solid also known as the mineral azurite. It too has been used as pigment, sometimes under the name mountain blue or blue verditer.

Both malachite and azurite can be found in the verdigris patina that is found on weathered brass, bronze, and copper. The composition of the patina can vary, in a maritime environment  depending on the environment a basic chloride may be present, in an urban environment basic sulfates may be present.

This compound is often improperly called (even in chemistry articles) copper carbonate,  cupric carbonate, and similar names.  The true (neutral)  copper(II) carbonate CuCO3 is not known to occur naturally.  It is decomposed by water or moisture from the air, and was synthesized only in 1973 by high temperature and very high pressures.

Preparation

 
Basic copper carbonate is prepared by combining aqueous solutions of copper(II) sulfate and sodium carbonate at ambient temperature and pressure. Basic copper carbonate precipitates from the solution, with release of carbon dioxide :

2 CuSO4 + 2 Na2CO3 + H2O →  Cu2(OH)2CO3 + 2 Na2SO4 + CO2

Basic copper carbonate can also be prepared by reacting aqueous solutions of copper(II) sulfate and sodium bicarbonate at ambient conditions.  Basic copper carbonate precipitates from the solution, again with release of carbon dioxide:

2 CuSO4 + 4 NaHCO3 → Cu2(OH)2CO3 + 2 Na2SO4 + 3 CO2 + H2O

Reactions

Basic copper carbonate is decomposed by acids, such as solutions of hydrochloric acid , into the copper(II) salt and carbon dioxide.

In 1794 the French chemist Joseph Louis Proust (1754–1826) thermally decomposed copper carbonate to CO2 and CuO, cupric oxide.

The basic copper carbonates, malachite and azurite, both decompose forming CO2 and CuO, cupric oxide.

Uses

Both malachite and azurite, as well as synthetic basic copper carbonate have been used as pigments. One example of the use of both azurite and its artificial form blue verditer is the portrait of the family of Balthasar Gerbier by Peter Paul Rubens. The green skirt of Deborah Kip is painted in azurite, smalt, blue verditer (artificial form of azurite), yellow ochre, lead-tin-yellow and yellow lake. The green color is achieved by mixing blue and yellow pigments.

It has also been used in some types of make-up, like lipstick, although it can also be toxic to humans. It also has been used for many years as an effective algaecide.

References

External links

National Pollutant Inventory – copper and compounds fact sheet
Azurite at ColourLex
Blue verditer at ColourLex
  

Carbonates
Copper(II) compounds
Pyrotechnic colorants
Hydroxides